The Immortal Weapons are fictional characters appearing in American comic books published by Marvel Comics. The Immortal Weapons first appear in The Immortal Iron Fist #8 (September 2007) and as a group, were created by Ed Brubaker, Matt Fraction and David Aja.

Publication history
The characters were first introduced in The Immortal Iron Fist #8—and remained supporting characters in the series until its cancellation (#27). The group then starred in their own series, which began in July 2009—with the first issue focusing on Fat Cobra; written by Jason Aaron and Duane Swierczynski with art by Mico Suayan and Travel Foreman.

Members
 Bride of Nine Spiders - A woman who controls spiders and can store them in her body.
 Dog Brother #1 -
 Fat Cobra -
 Prince of Orphans -
 Tiger's Beautiful Daughter -

Former Members
 Steel Phoenix -

Appearances
A list of appearances made by the group, categorised alphabetically:
 Defenders (2012) — #6
 Iron Man 2.0 (2011) — #5—6
 Spider-Island: Deadly Hands of Kung Fu (2011) — #3
 The Amazing Spider-Man (1963) — #672
 The Immortal Iron Fist (2007) — #8—14, #16, #19—20, #22—23 + #25—26
 Immortal Weapons (2009) — #1—5 (Fat Cobra #1, Bride of Nine Spiders #2, Dog Brother #3, Tiger's Beautiful Daughter #4 and Prince of Orphans #5)

In other media

Television

 Bride of Nine Spiders appears in Iron Fist played by Jane Kim. This version is a Korean arachnologist whose real name is Alessa. As a nod to her name in the comics, her lab number is 'B-09 S'. She appears in the episode "Immortal Emerges from Cave" where she is invited by Madame Gao to take part in a Da Jue Zhan (Grand Duel) against Danny Rand. Alessa is the second opponent that he faces and is shown to be a master of seduction and poison. Alessa manages to strike Danny with several poison needles before he manages the strength to kick her down defeating her.
 Fat Cobra appears in the Hulu animated series Hit-Monkey.

References

External links
 Immortal Weapons at Marvel.com

Characters created by Ed Brubaker
Iron Fist (comics)
Fictional organizations in Marvel Comics